The 1930 United States Senate election in Virginia was held on November 4, 1930. Incumbent Democratic Senator Carter Glass defeated Independent Democrat J. Cloyd Byars and Socialist Joe C. Morgan, and was elected to his third term in office.

Results

See also 
 United States Senate elections, 1930 and 1931

References

External links

Virginia
1930
1930 Virginia elections